Huélago is a municipality located in the province of Granada, Spain. According to the 2018 census (INE), the city has a population of 388 inhabitants.

References

Municipalities in the Province of Granada